Defending champion Monica Seles defeated Mary Joe Fernández in the final, 6–2, 6–3 to win the women's singles tennis title at the 1992 Australian Open.

Seeds
The seeded players are listed below. Monica Seles is the champion; others show the round in which they were eliminated.

  Monica Seles (champion)
  Steffi Graf (withdrew due to rubella)
  Gabriela Sabatini (semifinals)
  Arantxa Sánchez Vicario (semifinals)
  Jennifer Capriati (quarterfinals)
  Jana Novotná (fourth round)
  Mary Joe Fernández (finalist)
  Conchita Martínez (fourth round)
  Manuela Maleeva (quarterfinals)
  Katerina Maleeva (fourth round)
  Zina Garrison (fourth round)
  Anke Huber (quarterfinals)
  Leila Meskhi (fourth round)
  Judith Wiesner (second round)
  Helena Suková (third round)
  Sabine Appelmans (first round)

Qualifying

Draw

Key
 Q = Qualifier
 WC = Wild card
 LL = Lucky loser
 r = Retired

Finals

Earlier rounds

Section 1

Section 2

Section 3

Section 4

Section 5

Section 6

Section 7

Section 8

External links
 1992 Australian Open – Women's draws and results at the International Tennis Federation

 

Women's singles
Australian Open (tennis) by year – Women's singles
1992 in Australian women's sport
1992 WTA Tour